Savogna d'Isonzo is a comune (municipality) in  the Italian region Friuli-Venezia Giulia, located about  northwest of Trieste and about  southwest of Gorizia, on the border with Slovenia. The name of the village comes from the Slovene word sovodnje, which means confluence. Near Savogna, in fact, the Vipava river flows into the Isonzo at the conjunction of the Karst Plateau and the Vipava Valley.

Ethnic composition

92% of the population was of Slovene ethnicity according to the Italian census of 1971.

Main sights
Church of San Martino, at Savogna
Castle of Rubbia
Church of San Nicolò, at Gabria
Small square of Gabria
Grotta Regina del Carso

Twin towns
 Škofja Loka, Slovenia

References

See also
Julian March
Gorizia and Gradisca
Slovene Lands

Cities and towns in Friuli-Venezia Giulia
Vipava Valley